
Year 690 (DCXC) was a common year starting on Saturday (link will display the full calendar) of the Julian calendar. The denomination 690 for this year has been used since the early medieval period, when the Anno Domini calendar era became the prevalent method in Europe for naming years.

Events 
 By place 

 Britain 
 King Oswine of Kent is toppled by Wihtred, brother of the late king Eadric of Kent, after a 2-year reign. He takes his lands north of the River Thames, in revenge against the East Saxons (approximate date).

 Asia 
 October 16 – Wu Zetian ascends to the throne of the Tang Dynasty, and proclaims herself ruler of the Chinese Empire as "Holy and Divine Emperor". She becomes the first and only female "emperor" in 5,000 years of Chinese history. Wu Zetian changes the dynasty's name to the Zhou Dynasty, and begins to murder throne pretendants and ministers who try to oppose her. During her reign she elevates the status of Buddhism above Taoism.

 By topic 

 Entertainment 
 The approximate date of the earliest known blindfold chess, played by Sa'id ibn Jubayr

 Religion 
 Willibrord, Anglo-Saxon missionary, travels from York with 12 Benedictine monks to Westkapelle, (modern Netherlands) to  Christianize the pagan Frisians. 
 September 19 – Theodore of Tarsus, age 88, dies at Canterbury. He is succeeded by Berhtwald as the 9th Archbishop of Canterbury (approximate date).

Births 
 Ashot III, Armenian prince (approximate date)
 Rhodri Molwynog ap Idwal, king of Gwynedd (approximate date)

Deaths 
 September 19 – Theodore of Tarsus, Archbishop of Canterbury (b. 602)
 Aimé, Swiss bishop and saint
 Amalberga of Maubeuge, Lotharingian saint (approximate date)
 Benedict Biscop, Anglo-Saxon abbot
 Bertha of Val d'Or, Frankish abbess (approximate date)
 Julian, archbishop of Toledo (b. 642)
 Kusaila, Berber leader (approximate date)
 Landrada, Frankish abbess (approximate date)
 Nukata, Japanese poet (b. c. 630) 
 Oswine, king of Kent (approximate date)

References

Sources